Araneus pallidus is an orb-weaving spider found in Southwest Europe (Portugal, Spain, France) and Northwest Africa (Algeria).

See also 
 List of Araneidae species: A

References

External links 

pallidus
Spiders of Europe
Spiders of North Africa
Spiders described in 1789